Ecclitica is a genus of moths belonging to the subfamily Tortricinae of the family Tortricidae.

Species
Ecclitica hemiclista (Meyrick, 1905)
Ecclitica philpotti (Dugdale, 1978)
Ecclitica torogramma (Meyrick, 1897)
Ecclitica triorthota (Meyrick, 1927)

See also
List of Tortricidae genera

References

 , 1923, Trans. New Zealand Inst. 54: 164. 
 , 2005, World Catalogue of Insects 5.

External links
tortricidae.com

Archipini
Tortricidae genera